Thuwal is a Hejazi village belonging to the governorate of Jeddah in the Makkah Province of Saudi Arabia,  north of Jeddah on the coast of the Red Sea.

Overview
Thuwal had long been a fishing center until the Royal Saudi Navy reconstructed the village.

Thuwal hosts the King Abdullah University of Science and Technology (KAUST), which officially opened in September 2009.

The town is also experiencing an increase in business due to its proximity to the King Abdullah Economic City. Thuwal attracts seafood lovers to its fish restaurants.

Transport
Thuwal is connected by Highway 60 to Rabigh and Yanbu.

KAUST university

Thuwal is the home of King Abdullah University of Science and Technology (KAUST) (Arabic: جامعة الملك عبد الله للعلوم و التقنية jāmiʿat al-malik ʿabd al-Lāh li-l-ʿulūm wa-t-teqniyya), a private research university which was founded in 2009. The university provides research and graduate training programs in English as the official language of instruction.

See also

Dahaban

References

Populated places in Mecca Province
Geography of Jeddah